Survivor: Island of the Idols is the 39th season of the American competitive reality television series Survivor, The season was filmed in Fiji during April and May 2019, and aired on CBS in the United States and Global in Canada from September 25, 2019 until December 18, 2019, when Tommy Sheehan was named the winner by an 8-2-0 vote over Dean Kowalski and Noura Salman.

This season introduced the eponymous Island of the Idols, as Survivor alumni Sandra Diaz-Twine, winner of Survivor: Pearl Islands and Survivor: Heroes vs. Villains, and Rob Mariano, winner of Survivor: Redemption Island, returned to the game as mentors living on the Island of the Idols, though they did not compete for the million-dollar prize themselves. Instead, Diaz-Twine and Mariano periodically hosted a contestant each episode and gave them a lesson to assist them in the game. They also gave the contestant a chance to win an advantage, but if they failed, they lost their vote at their next Tribal Council.

The season received widespread media attention after contestant Dan Spilo was accused of inappropriately touching female contestants. While there was no in-game recourse provided from the production crew, Spilo was later ejected from the game following an off-camera incident involving a crew member. CBS and Survivor producers issued an apology for how they handled the situation and announced they would make significant changes to their safety protocols, to be fully in place by the 41st season, filming of which took place two years later following Island of the Idols airing.

Production

This season featured the Island of the Idols, a secluded location inhabited by Survivor winners Sandra Diaz-Twine and Rob Mariano, acting as non-competing advisers. Castaways were periodically exiled to the island throughout the season, where Diaz-Twine and Mariano taught them a lesson about a specific skill designed to help them in the game, such as fire-making or active listening, and then offered them an optional challenge to test that skill. Winning the challenge would yield a reward such as a hidden immunity idol or vote blocker, while losing the challenge meant losing the right to vote at the next Tribal Council attended by the losing castaway (though this was not revealed to the other players; a castaway without a vote would still go to the voting area during Tribal Council, but would write "no vote" on the parchment). Diaz-Twine and Mariano were not eligible to compete or win the grand prize, nor could they vote at Tribal Council. Unbeknownst to the castaways, the mentors secretly attended each Tribal Council in a hideaway, allowing them to eavesdrop on the proceedings.

According to host and executive producer Jeff Probst, the idea to bring back past champions as mentors came from "wondering how to get a player like Boston Rob, who has said he'd never compete again because he doesn't feel he'd ever really have a shot to win, to return to the show." Probst considered the mentors to be equivalent of on-camera producers for this season. Mariano and Diaz-Twine were even involved with the pre-production phase, posing for 3D modeling of their heads for the statues, and providing input on the type of lessons they would be able to teach, as well as how they would present these lessons. The two also had flexibility as to how significant each advantage would be, such as making an advantage be valid for a time ranging from one to three Tribal Councils. According to Diaz-Twine, Probst compared their mentor roles similarly to the single-episode cameo by Survivor: Caramoan winner John Cochran during Survivor: Game Changers, where he had provided strategic advice to a player as part of a reward. Diaz-Twine and Mariano later returned to compete on the subsequent season, Survivor: Winners at War, which began filming in Fiji weeks after Island of the Idols production concluded, though this had not yet been confirmed when they were cast for this season.

Probst said that production wanted players to try to figure out with as little information that they were told: that the title of the season was "Island of the Idols" and had hoped players would question if the separate island would be filled with immunity idols. They were not sure how players who were taken to the Island would behave on their return whether they would tell the truth or lie about what happened on the island, and were surprised that all players fibbed and did not discuss Rob or Sandra's presence there.

Island of the Idols became the first season to feature a Canadian-born castaway (Tom Laidlaw), as the casting process opened for Canadian residents in mid-2018. Previously, Canadian citizens had been ineligible to compete on the show as, according to Probst, the limitation was due to the rights that Mark Burnett and CBS had on the Survivor format, limiting it to contestants with American citizenship. While Survivor has had contestants with dual citizenship in the past, such as Survivor: China winner Todd Herzog, they were required to give up their non-U.S. citizenship as a prerequisite for claiming their prize money.

Contestants

Notable contestants from this season include retired National Hockey League defenseman Tom Laidlaw, Olympic swimmer Elizabeth Beisel, and professional poker player Ronnie Bardah.

Future appearances
Tommy Sheehan competed on the thirty-seventh season of the MTV reality competition show The Challenge. Chelsea Walker competed on the revival of Legends of the Hidden Temple.

Season summary
The 20 new castaways were randomly divided into two tribes of ten (Lairo and Vokai). Vokai won nearly every challenge, even after a tribe swap. Missy controlled much of the strategy on Lairo, while Vokai was run by Lauren and Tommy. At the swap, Lairo outsider Karishma flipped on her old tribe, while new bonds were formed on both tribes, causing some of the players to forgo their old alliances.

At the merge, Dan had been accused of inappropriate touching by several women on the tribe. In the midst of this, Lauren and Tommy used their social bonds to ultimately dismantle the Lairo alliance until only Dean remained. After Dan's ejection for an unspecified incident with a crewmember, Dean kept himself in the game by winning immunity challenges while Elaine and Janet were eliminated as they were considered too likeable to take to the end.

The Final Four were Dean, Lauren, Noura, and Tommy; Noura won the final challenge, and Tommy convinced her to take him to the end. Dean joined them in the Final Three after defeating Lauren in the fire-making challenge. The jury ultimately rewarded Tommy's strong social game by voting him the Sole Survivor.

Episodes

Voting history

Notes

Controversy 

From the first episode up until the merge in the eighth episode, Kellee Kim and several other members of the Vokai tribe had expressed concerns to Dan Spilo about him repeatedly touching them without asking. At the merge, Kim had her first opportunity to speak to Missy Byrd, who also stated her concerns on Spilo's behavior. Kim spoke of her concerns to the merged tribe, at which point production became much more involved. One Survivor producer explained to Kim that she should let them know if Spilo continued to cross the line, and if she did, then production would immediately take action. Production contacted CBS about the situation, who instructed them to have group and individual meetings with the remaining castaways and formally warned Spilo about his behavior. Title cards were used in-episode to explain the situation to viewers. 

Though not in her best game interests at the time, Kim and her ally Janet Carbin ultimately agreed to vote out Spilo at the first merge Tribal Council, believing to have support from the other women on the tribe, including Byrd and Elizabeth Beisel, who had both expressed discomfort towards his actions. However, Kim saw herself being voted out of the game after a majority of the tribe believed her to be a bigger in-game threat than Spilo was. Issues on Spilo's behavior persisted in the tribe through the next few days, as both Beisel and Byrd admitted that they did not have any issues with him, and had simply decided to play on Kim's concerns in an attempt to gain her trust. At the next Tribal Council, the impact of Spilo's behavior had come up, and Spilo took time to apologize to Kim and the other female tribe members for any wrongdoing, even bringing up the impact of the Me Too movement during his speech. The day after the episode aired, several contestants posted public apologies to Kim and Carbin for their behavior—seeing the problems with it after watching the episode—and for not seeing how much the situation affected the two women.

Probst claimed that he and production talked to Kim about letting her have a chance to respond to Spilo, but she agreed with production that as a jury member she would remain quiet as per the game's rules. Kim would later contradict this statement, claiming that she did not speak with Probst at all until after that particular Tribal Council. For the remainder of the season, production continued to monitor the situation, with the staff performing individual interviews with players keeping abreast of any concerns or issues related to the situation and reminding contestants to report anything they feel uncomfortable about to production immediately. At the end of Episode 12, on the morning of Day 36, Probst came to camp and announced to the remaining castaways that Spilo had been removed from the game, and would not be allowed to serve on the jury. A title card revealed that Spilo was ejected because of an off-camera incident that "did not involve a player." In an interview, Probst declined to elaborate on what happened, citing "privacy and confidentiality" concerns. This is the first time a contestant had to be ejected from the show by production.

Many fans argued that Spilo should have been ejected from the game when Kim's concerns were first raised instead of creating a storyline out of it for the show. CBS and MGM issued a joint statement reiterating that production had been monitoring the situation around the clock, as part of the standard practice for the show, and would have taken action if they felt Kim or any other player was at risk. "On Survivor, producers provide the castaways a wide berth to play the game. At the same time, all castaways are monitored and supervised at all times. They have full access to producers and doctors, and the production will intervene in situations where warranted." Other fans were upset at Beisel and Byrd for invalidating Spilo's misconduct and using the situation to leverage their games. 

For the first time in the show's history, the finale and reunion shows were pre-taped, rather than aired live. The show went "live-to-tape" four hours earlier than usual to screen for potentially sensitive material relating to the allegations against Spilo and his subsequent ejection. Spilo was uninvited from the reunion following his ejection, while Biesel and Jack Nichting also did not show up to the finale. The reunion included a one-on-one interview between Probst and Kim to address the allegations and the way they were handled, and resulted in Probst apologizing to Kim on behalf of the production team.

CBS and Survivor issued a second statement on December 18, 2019, prior to the finale to readdress the protocol for future seasons. Due to these events, castaways in Season 40 (which was filmed immediately after this season was) were given additional pre-production guidelines on "personal space, inappropriate behavior, and how to report these issues". Future seasons will see this orientation expanded to include the means to which castaways can report their concerns of other players in a confidential manner to production, and production will improve their staff's training to watch for these issues ahead of time, and to add a support system for affected castaways as part of their available on-island and post-elimination mental health support. Further, new rules will disallow "unwelcome physical contact, sexual harassment and impermissible biases" to be brought into the game, or they may led to a castaway's dismissal from the game. Additionally, during the reunion, Probst apologized directly to Kim on behalf of the show and CBS for mistakes that were made, and then gave Kim several minutes to express her concerns and additional thoughts from the incident. Kim stated that the hardest part of the situation was not what Spilo did, but that she felt that she was "not supported or believed" by production, which Probst said was a misstep on their part. In response to these announced changes, Kim said "This has been a hard season, but I’m proud that the change I fought for is happening. I’ve been inspired & overwhelmed by the people who have reached out to support me & share their stories."

Spilo spoke to People after the conclusion of the season, saying "I am deeply sorry for how my actions affected Kellee during the taping of this season of Survivor...After apologizing at the Tribal Council when I first learned that Kellee still felt uncomfortable, I want to make sure I do so again, clearly and unambiguously."

Reception

Critical response 
Survivor: Island of the Idols was initially praised for the diverse cast and its gameplay prior to the merge episode. However, the controversy regarding Dan Spilo was met with universal disdain and intense criticism, resulting in the season receiving extremely negative reviews from critics. Additional criticism was pointed at the following post-merge episodes, the edit portraying a very predictable winner, as well as the idol nullifier twist (obtained via a random coin flip) controversially ousting crowd-favorite Janet Carbin. 

Andy Dehnart of Reality Blurred labeled the season as the worst ever while pointing out several systemic problems with the show as a whole. He noted that the past five seasons were all won by men, while the past four seasons had featured only one female finalist who did not receive a single vote at the Final Tribal Council. He stated, "in the last five seasons, there have been fifty-two jury votes cast, and fifty of those have gone to men." He also lambasted the show for not having a proper protocol in dealing with sexual harassment until the "inappropriate touching" controversy essentially forced CBS to develop a formal one.

Daniel Fienberg of The Hollywood Reporter wrote that the inaction from producers had not only ruined the season but tainted the legacy and future of Survivor. He stated, "Somewhere, somebody needs to feel shame — not embarrassment, but shame — at what happened this season and owing to potential legal ramifications, I doubt we'll see any regret or remorse at all. I'm not accusing anybody of a crime. All I'm saying is: Kellee deserved better. The women of Survivor deserved better. The fans of Survivor deserved better. I don't know how anybody is supposed to trust the show to do right by its contestants again. You broke it, Survivor gang. I don't know how you're going to fix it."

Caroline Framke of Variety stated that the way that CBS handled the controversy was "irresponsible and infuriating." Specifically, she talked about the merge episode, which highlighted the Dan Spilo controversy, and the ninth episode, which aired one week after the merge episode and did not discuss the controversy at all. She stated, "It's downright insulting, and a baffling display of the show's inability to grasp the gravity of what happened on its watch."

James Poniewozik of The New York Times talked about the ending to the twelfth episode when Dan was ejected from the game. He stated, "Wednesday's episode abruptly ended with the cryptic announcement that a contestant, Dan Spilo, had been ejected from the show after an 'incident.' But regular viewers knew that this was just another twist in a story that had tarnished the season." He goes on to explain how CBS "failed its #MeToo test," accusing the network of not listening to Kellee Kim's complaints and concerns the first time she spoke about them.

Dalton Ross of Entertainment Weekly, ranking the Survivor seasons through the 40th installment, placed Island of the Idols at the bottom of the list. He called the season "impossible to enjoy" due to Spilo's actions, and stated that "even though there were several things and people worth celebrating at various points in the show's 39th installment, the end result is that this felt like the least entertaining outing in the franchise’s history."

Survivor fan site "The Purple Rock Podcast" ranked Island of the Idols 39th out of 40 seasons in 2020, stating that the "pre-merge portion of the game is enjoyable" but the season's "potential is completely squandered by the actions (and inaction) of the show's production team."

Inside Survivor ranked this season 38th out of 40 saying that the bright spots are few and far between after the events of the merge and that the rewatch value is extremely low.

Rob Has a Podcast ranked Island of the Idols 40th during their Survivor All-Time Top 40 Rankings podcast.

Viewing figures

United States

Canada

References

External links
 Official CBS Survivor Website

39
2019 American television seasons
2019 in Fiji
Television shows filmed in Fiji
Television shows set in Fiji